Kazinag Peak is a mountain with peak elevation of  meters from sea level, located in the uri to Dangiwacha of district baramulla to kupwara, Jammu and Kashmir in India.  It forms part of the Line of Control between Pakistan and India.

On top stands the historic Kazinag spring, Satkhol Nag and Kazinag Glacier which provides water to the Mawar, Humal stream and Vig . It usually remains snow clad throughout the year. It is home to Markhor, an endangered species of mountain goat.

References

Mountains of Jammu and Kashmir